Ting Chi (born 2 June 1995) is a Taiwanese footballer who plays as a midfielder for Taiwan Mulan Football League club Inter Taoyuan and the Chinese Taipei women's national team.

International goals
Scores and results list Chinese Taipei's goal tally first.

References

1995 births
Living people
Women's association football midfielders
Taiwanese women's footballers
Chinese Taipei women's international footballers
Asian Games competitors for Chinese Taipei
Footballers at the 2018 Asian Games
Taiwanese women's futsal players